Agarpara is a locality in Panihati Municipality of North 24 Parganas district in the Indian state of West Bengal. It is close to Kolkata and also a part of the area covered by Kolkata Metropolitan Development Authority (KMDA).Agarpara has two pincode area -(a)700058,(b)700109

History
In the past, a community named Aghore, who were specialized in boat making, used to live here. Earlier this place was known as Agrapalli, from where the name has been changed into Aagarpara. Agarpara Union was officially established on 23 July 1867. Sen estate and Sen family had been the recorded oldest inhabitant of Agarpara. Also, Ghosh family of Tarapukur, Parbat family of East Station Road and Majumder family of North Station Road are the three oldest living families in this town.

Geography

Location
96% of the population of Barrackpore subdivision (partly presented in the map alongside, all places marked in the map are linked in the full screen map) lives in urban areas. In 2011, it had a density of population of 10,967 per km2. The subdivision has 16 municipalities and 24 census towns.

For most of the cities/ towns information regarding density of population is available in the Infobox. Population data is not available for neighbourhoods. It is available for the entire Municipal area and thereafter ward-wise.

Kolkata Urban Agglomeration
The following Municipalities, Census Towns and other locations in Barrackpore subdivision were part of Kolkata Urban Agglomeration in the 2011 census: Kanchrapara (M), Jetia (CT), Halisahar (M), Balibhara (CT), Naihati (M), Bhatpara (M), Kaugachhi (CT), Garshyamnagar (CT), Garulia (M), Ichhapur Defence Estate (CT), North Barrackpur (M), Barrackpur Cantonment (CB), Barrackpore (M), Jafarpur (CT), Ruiya (CT), Titagarh (M), Khardaha (M), Bandipur (CT), Panihati (M), Muragachha (CT) New Barrackpore (M), Chandpur (CT), Talbandha (CT), Patulia (CT), Kamarhati (M), Baranagar (M), South Dumdum (M), North Dumdum (M), Dum Dum (M), Noapara (CT), Babanpur (CT), Teghari (CT), Nanna (OG), Chakla (OG), Srotribati (OG) and Panpur (OG).

Agarpara is part of Panihati Municipality.

Economy

Industry
Agarpara is the part of the Barrackpore Industrial Region. Factories like Texmaco, Duckback, Priya Biscuits operate their units here. Also, the Tractor India Ltd., Himani, Aditya Shukla movie Production, National Tobacco Company and numerous jute and cotton mills establish Agarpara as an enriched industrial town.

Transport

Rail
Agarpara railway station is one of the busiest Railway stations on the Sealdah division main section. One can reach Agarpara by local Train within 20 minutes from Sealdah railway station.

Commuters
Around a total of 32 lakh people from all around the city commute to Kolkata daily for work. In the Sealdah-Krishnanagar section there are 34 trains that carry commuters from 30 railway stations. In the Sealdah-Shantipur section 32 trains carry commuters from 29 stations.

Road and Ferry
There are frequent bus services which connect Agarpara to several neighbourhoods of Kolkata through Barrackpore Trunk Road (B.T. Road) :- 78 (Barrackpore Court to Esplanade), 78/1 (Rahara to Babughat), 81/1 (Barasat to Rajchandrapur), 214 (Sajirhat to Babughat), 214A (Sodepur Girja to Esplanade), 230 (Agarpara railway station to Alipore Zoo), C28 and S32 (Barrackpore Court to Howrah Station), S11 (Nilganj to Esplanade), E32 (Nilganj to Howrah Station) etc. Tentultala bus stop is on the crossing of North Station Road and B.T. Road. Also, the famous Nilgunj Road goes through this town.

The town is connected to the other side of the Hooghly River by regular ferry service.

Education
Primary schools like Path Bhaban Shishu Shiksha Niketan,Vivekananda Vidyamandir, and B G Memorial,  are doing really well in the last few years. Ushumpur Adarsha Uchcha Vidyalaya (Boys/ Girls),Shri Saraswati Vidyalaya High School, Texmaco High School, Agarpara Mahajati Vidyapith, Savitri Mahajati Balika Vidyapith, Netaji Sikhshayatan are the popular high schools here, all affiliated to West Bengal Board. Narula Institute of Technology, a private engineering college, is situated in Agarpara. The college is affiliated to the West Bengal University of Technology (WBUT) and approved by AICTE. JIS University, a privately funded UGC recognised university is also situated in Agarpara.

References

Cities and towns in North 24 Parganas district
Neighbourhoods in Kolkata
Kolkata Metropolitan Area
Neighbourhoods in North 24 Parganas district